Marvin Certeza Lim (born April 7, 1984) is a Filipino-American politician from Georgia. Lim is a Democrat member of Georgia House of Representatives for District 99.

Early life
Lim was born in the Philippines and immigrated to Atlanta, Georgia at the age of 7.

References

External links 
 Marvin Lim at ballotpedia.org

Asian-American people in Georgia (U.S. state) politics
American politicians of Filipino descent
American people of Filipino descent
Filipino emigrants to the United States
Democratic Party members of the Georgia House of Representatives
21st-century American politicians
Living people
1984 births